The 2019 St. George Illawarra Dragons season was the 21st in the joint venture club's history. The Dragons' men's team competed in the NRL's 2019 Telstra Premiership season while the women completed their second year in the NRLW's 2019 Holden Women's Premiership season.

Squad

Gains and Losses

Ladder

Ladder Progression

Season Results

Pre-Season Trials

NRL Season

Representative Honours 
The following players have played a representative match in 2019.

NRL Women's

Ladder

Ladder Progression

Season Results

Notes 

 1: This match was a curtain-raiser to the Parramatta Eels vs Brisbane Broncos finals match, which got a crowd of 29,372.
 2: This match was a curtain-raiser to the NRL Grand Final, which got a crowd of 82,922.

References 

St. George Illawarra Dragons seasons
St. George Illawarra Dragons season
2019 NRL Women's season